Sirsihawa  is a town in Krishnanagar Municipality in Kapilvastu District in the Lumbini Province of southern Nepal. The former Village development committee was merged to form the municipality established on 18 May 2014 Krishnanagar, Sirsihawa, Shivanagar VDCs. At the time of the 1991 Nepal census it had a population of 2,745 in 458 individual households.

References

Populated places in Kapilvastu District